Ernest Perry may refer to:
 Ernest Perry (politician) (1910–1998), British politician
 Ernest Perry (footballer) (1891–1979), English footballer
 Ernest Perry (cricketer) (1908–1996), English cricketer